Aleman (Alleman, Allman and variants) is a surname with origins in the Romance language speaking parts of Western Europe, derived from the 
name for Germany derived from the name of the Alamanni (the Frankish duchy of Alamannia), 
French Allemagne, Spanish Alemania, etc.
The surname is thus a toponymic surname, and would originally have been given to a person of German origin in a Romance speaking area.

Variants of the surname include English (from Norman French) Allman, Alleman, French Allemand, Spanish Aleman (Alemán), among others.  
Alman can be a variant of Allman, Alleman, but also of unrelated Swedish or German Ahl(e)mann or Jewish Almen.

People with this surname
Aleman, Alemán
Garnier l'Aleman (died after 1231),  German Crusader, also known as Werner of Egisheim 
Hugh l'Aleman (died before 1241), nobleman of the Kingdom of Jerusalem
Hugh l'Aleman (died 1264),  knight of the Kingdom of Jerusalem and heir to the Lordship of Caesarea
John Aleman (died after 1264), the Lord of Caesarea (as John II) in the Kingdom of Jerusalem
Alberto Aleman (b. c. 1951) Panamanian director of the Panama Canal
Allan Alemán (b. 1983), Costa Rican footballer
André Aleman (b. 1975), Dutch neuroscientist
Armando Alemán (b. 1904), Spanish Olympic fencer
Arnoldo Alemán (b. 1946), Nicaraguan politician, president of Nicaragua from 1997 to 2002
Consuelo Villalon Aleman (1907–1998), Mexican pianist
Eulalio Ríos Alemán (–), Mexican Olympic swimmer
Fedora Alemán (1912–2018), Venezuelan operatic soprano
Gabriela Alemán (born 1968), Ecuadorian writer 
Gonzalo Alemán Migliolo (born 1954), Mexican politician
Hernán Alemán (politician) (1955–2020), Venezuelan politician, also known as Claret Alemán Pérez
Harry "The Hook" Aleman (1939–2010), American mobster
Jaime Aleman Healy (born 1953), Panamanian lawyer, businessman and diplomat
José Braulio Alemán (1864–1930), Cuban Brigadier General
José Miguel Alemán (b. 1956), Panamanian politician
Juan Carlos Alemán Soto (b. 1966),  Guatemala's Minister of National Defence
Julio Alemán (b. 1933), Mexican actor
Laura Alemán, Puerto Rican actress and singer
Louis Aleman (1390–1450), French cardinal
Lucas Alamán (1792–1853), Mexican historian and politician
Mateo Alemán (1547–), Spanish novelist
Miguel Alemán González (1884–1929), Mexican general  
Miguel Alemán Valdés (1902–1983), Mexican politician, president of Mexico from 1946 to 1952
Miguel Alemán Velasco (b. 1932), Mexican politician, governor of Veracruz from 1998 to 2004
Miguel Alemán (1906–1979), Cuban chess master
Nauzet Alemán (b. 1985), Spanish footballer
Oscar Alemán (1909–1980), Argentine jazz guitarist
René Aleman (1913–1989), French weightlifter

Alman

Allman

other
Ellen Alemany, American CEO of Citizens Financial Group
Jean Allemand (1799–1833), French Catholic priest and Orientalist
Joseph Sadoc Alemany (1814–1888), O.P., Catalan American archbishop.
Serafino Allemano, Italian entrepreneur, founder of Carrozzeria Allemano

See also
Allemann (surname)
Alamanni (surname)
Alleman (disambiguation)
Allman (disambiguation)
Allemand (disambiguation)
Alemão (disambiguation)
Alemanno

References

External links

Ethnonymic surnames